Brenda Andrea Smith Lezama (born 25 May 1994) is a Panamanian-American actress, journalism, model and beauty pageant titleholder who was crowned Señorita Panamá 2021. She represented Panama at the Miss Universe 2021 pageant in Eilat, Israel.

Early life
Smith was born in Georgia, United States. Her father is from Panamá and her mother is Mexican. Smith received a BA in journalism from the University of Missouri. </ref>

She has appeared on several television shows, including PBS NewsHour, Dr. Drew on Call, and  MSNBC Live.

In 2018, she appeared in the television series El gordo y la flaca, República Deportiva, Nuestra Belleza Latina , ¡Wake up America!, and Los Cousins. She also played a therapist in the short film "Reversion."

She played Verletta Walker in the short film "Little Stylist", which was released in the United States on June 1, 2019.

Pageantry

Miss Georgia Teen USA 2012
Smith began her beauty pageant career in 2012, entering the Miss Georgia Teen USA 2012 pageant, where she was 2nd runner-up.

Miss Missouri Teen USA 2013
Smith entered and was crowned the 2013 Miss Missouri Teen USA pageant and was succeeded by Jayde Ogle.

Miss Teen USA 2013
On August 10, 2013, Smith represented Missouri at the 2013 Miss Teen USA pageant at the Grand Ballroom, Atlantis Paradise Island in Nassau, Bahamas. It finished in the Top 16.

Miss Georgia USA 2017
Smith entered and was placed 1st runner-up in the Miss Georgia USA 2017 pageant and ultimately lost to winner DeAnna Johnson of Hazlehurst.

Mexicana Universal 2020
Smith competed as MxU Mexico City, one of the 30 finalists in her country's national beauty contest at Mexicana Universal 2020. She was ranked 2nd runner-up and lost to eventual winner Andrea Meza from Chihuahua.

Señorita Panamá 2021
On November 7, 2021, Smith participated and represented Panama Centro in the Señorita Panamá 2021 contest at the Wyndham Convention Center Hotel in Panama City.

At the end of the event, Smith won the title of Miss Universe Panama 2021 and succeeded Carmen Jaramillo.

Miss Universe 2021
On December 13, 2021, Smith represented Panama at the Miss Universe 2021 pageant in Eilat, Israel, and finished in the Top 16.

References

External links
 
 Website of Señorita Panamá

1994 births
Living people
African-American female models
American people of Mexican descent
American people of Panamanian descent
Beauty pageant contestants from Georgia (U.S. state)
2013 beauty pageant contestants
21st-century Miss Teen USA delegates
Miss Universe 2021 contestants
Panamanian female models
Panamanian people of Mexican descent
Panamanian beauty pageant winners
Señorita Panamá
University of Missouri alumni